Big Al is a stand-up comedian who lives in Adelaide, South Australia. He starred alongside fellow Adelaide comedian Mark Trenwith in the comedy show Give Us A Hug in the 2006 Adelaide Fringe Festival.

He was one of the finalists in FHM's Search for Australia's Funniest Man.

Big Al hosts a weekly radio program on Fresh FM.

Live shows 
 Scott and Big Al's Big Night Out - 2004 Adelaide Fringe Festival
 Give Us a Hug - 2006 Adelaide Fringe Festival
 Best of Adelaide Comedy - 2006 Melbourne International Comedy Festival
 Best of Adelaide Comedy - 2007 Adelaide Fringe Festival
 Life on a Budget - 2008 Adelaide Fringe Festival

References 
 Big Al's profile on the Adelaide Comedy website

Australian stand-up comedians
Living people
Australian male comedians
Year of birth missing (living people)